Novak Djokovic defeated Denis Shapovalov in the final, 6–3, 6–4 to win the singles tennis title at the 2019 Paris Masters. It was his record-extending fifth Paris Masters title, and he did not drop a set en route.

Karen Khachanov was the defending champion, but lost in the second round to Jan-Lennard Struff.

Rafael Nadal replaced Djokovic as the ATP no. 1 singles player after the tournament.

Seeds
All seeds receive a bye into the second round.

Draw

Finals

Top half

Section 1

Section 2

Bottom half

Section 3

Section 4

Qualifying

Seeds

Qualifiers

Lucky losers

Qualifying draw

First qualifier

Second qualifier

Third qualifier

Fourth qualifier

Fifth qualifier

Sixth qualifier

References

External links
 Main draw
 Qualifying draw

Singles